The 2014–15 Azerbaijan Premier League was the 23rd season of Azerbaijan Premier League, the Azerbaijani professional league for association football clubs, since its establishment in 1992. Qarabağ are the defending champions, having won the previous season. The season started on 9 August 2014 and ended on 28 May 2015.

Teams 

Ravan Baku were relegated to Azerbaijan First Division.

The format of the league not change as a total of 10 teams will contest the league, with the last club relegated and Araz-Naxçıvan promoted from the First Division. The competition format follows the usual double round-robin format. During the course of a season, which lasts from August to May, each club plays every other club four times, twice at home and twice away, for a total of 36 games.

On 3 November 2014, the Araz-Naxçıvan announced their withdrawal from the league due constant biased referee decisions, which meant that all of their results were annulled. This also meant that no club will be relegated by end of the season.

Stadia and locations
Note: Table lists in alphabetical order.

Personnel and kits

Note: Flags indicate national team as has been defined under FIFA eligibility rules. Players may hold more than one non-FIFA nationality.

Managerial changes

League table

Results

Games 1–18

Games 19–36

Season statistics

Scoring
 First goal of the season: Rauf Aliyev for Khazar against AZAL (9 August 2014)
 Fastest goal of the season: 1st minute, 
Freddy Mombongo-Dues for AZAL against Inter Baku (19 February 2015)
 Latest goal of the season: 94 minutes, 
Mirhuseyn Seyidov for Neftchi Baku against Khazar Lankaran (24 November 2014)
 Largest winning margin: 7 goals
Inter Baku 7–0 Baku (19 September 2014)
 Highest scoring game: 7 goals
Inter Baku 7–0 Baku (19 September 2014)
 Most goals scored in a match by a single team: 7 goals
Inter Baku 7–0 Baku (19 September 2014)

Top scorers

Hat-tricks

 4 Player scored 4 goals

Discipline

Player
 Most yellow cards; 12
Ruslan Abışov (Gabala)
Alfred Sankoh (Khazar Lankaran)
Éric Ramos (Neftchi Baku)

 Most red cards; 2
Vugar Baybalayev (Baku)
Elshad Manafov (Baku)
Carlos Cardoso (Neftchi Baku)

Club
 Most yellow cards: 105
Neftchi Baku
 Most red cards: 8
Baku
Neftchi Baku

References

External links
 

2014–15 in European association football leagues
2014-15
1